Florence is an unincorporated community in Paint Township, Madison County, Ohio, United States.

Florence was never platted; the community simply grew around a station built on the Pennsylvania Railroad.  As of 1915, the community contained one grain elevator, one general store, the railroad station and freight depot, and only a few houses.

References 

Unincorporated communities in Madison County, Ohio
Unincorporated communities in Ohio